Constituent Assembly elections were held in Laos on 15 December 1946. The elections were held on a non-partisan basis, with all candidates running as independents.

References

Laos
Elections in Laos
Constituent Assembly election
Non-partisan elections
Election and referendum articles with incomplete results